State Trunk Highway 79 (often called Highway 79, STH-79 or WIS 79) is a  state highway in Dunn County, Wisconsin, United States, that runs from U.S. Route 12 northwest of the city of Menomonie north to Wisconsin Highway 64 in Connorsville. WIS 79 is maintained by the Wisconsin Department of Transportation.

Route description
WIS 79 begins at an intersection with US 12 in the Town of Menomonie, northwest of the city of Menomonie. From here, the highway heads north across a Union Pacific Railroad line and passes through farmland. The route continues north into the Town of Sherman, where it intersects County Highway J. After crossing into the Town of Stanton, WIS 79 enters the village of Boyceville. The highway passes the Boyceville Municipal Airport before intersecting WIS 170; it follows this highway west for  before turning northward. WIS 79 crosses a Canadian National Railway line and Tiffany Creek before leaving Boyceville and entering the Town of Tiffany. In Tiffany, the route intersects County Highway N before crossing the South Fork Hay River, after which it roughly follows the river northwest. After meeting County Highway O and crossing into the Town of New Haven, WIS 79 enters the community of Connorsville, where it terminates at WIS 64; the road continues northward as County Highway K.

Major intersections

See also

References

External links

079
Transportation in Dunn County, Wisconsin